Federal elections were held in Switzerland on 27 October 1872. The Radical Left remained the largest group in the National Council.

Electoral system
The 135 members of the National Council were elected in 48 single- and multi-member constituencies using a three-round system. Candidates had to receive a majority in the first or second round to be elected; if it went to a third round, only a plurality was required. Voters could cast as many votes as there were seats in their constituency. For the first time the National Council was directly-elected in its entirety; in previous elections the cantons of Appenzell Innerrhoden, Appenzell Ausserrhoden, Glarus, Nidwalden, Obwalden and Uri had their National Council members elected by the Landsgemeinde. However, an electoral law passed in 1872 required secret voting for federal elections and a polling station to be opened in every municipality in order to avoid manipulation in the open Landsgemeinde. The electoral law also changed the calculation of a candidate's majority from including valid and invalid votes to only valid votes.

There was one seat for every 20,000 citizens, with seats allocated to cantons in proportion to their population. Following the 1869 elections the number of seats was increased from 128 to 137, with the members now elected from 48 constituencies, increased from 47. Bern gained two seats, whilst Fribourg, Neuchâtel, Solothurn, St Gallen and Zürich gained one each.

Results

National Council 
Voter turnout was highest in the Canton of Uri at 91.3% (higher than the 75.2% who voted in Schaffhausen, where voting was compulsory) and lowest in Schwyz at 39.8%.

By constituency

Election re-runs

Council of States

References

1872
1872 elections in Europe
1872 in Switzerland